Margaret Elizabeth Vanderhaeghe (March 22, 1950 in Leader, Saskatchewan – May 18, 2012) was a Canadian artist. Her ancestors were Volksdeutsche, and much of her work was influenced by this community. She was known for her paintings, which often include themes of identity, memory and gender. Vanderhaeghe received a Bachelor of Arts with a major in Art (1971) and a Bachelor of Arts (1972) from the University of Saskatchewan. She was married to Canadian writer Guy Vanderhaeghe on September 2, 1972.

Career

Vanderhaeghe was a painting instructor at the Cypress Hills Community College in Swift Current, Saskatchewan in 1979. In 1992, she received the Canada 125 Medal for her contributions to the artistic community in Saskatchewan. In 2003, a documentary on her work was included in The Artist’s Life series and aired on Bravo.

Vanderhaeghe's work is represented in several collections, including the MacKenzie Art Gallery (Regina), the Saskatchewan Arts Board, the Mendel Art Gallery (Saskatoon), the City of Ottawa Corporate Collection, the University of Lethbridge Art Gallery, the University of Saskatchewan (Saskatoon), and Grant MacEwan College (Edmonton).

Solo exhibitions
Selected solo exhibitions:
 1984 - Recent Works. Assiniboia Gallery, Regina, Saskatchewan.
 1988 - At Home in Our Own Skins. AKA Gallery, Saskatoon, Saskatchewan.

References

Sources 
 Margaret Elizabeth Vanderhaeghe Obituary. Saskatoon StarPhoenix. Retrieved 2016-03-05.
 Robertson, Sheila. (29 October 1983). "Priest Elevates Role of Polish." Star Phoenix. (Saskatoon).
 Robertson, Sheila. (24 September 1988). "Nine Artists Reveal How They've Grown." Star Phoenix (Saskatoon).
 Robertson, Sheila. (3 December 1988). "Paintings Reveal Dark Memories." Star Phoenix. (Saskatoon).

20th-century Canadian women artists
20th-century Canadian artists
21st-century Canadian women artists
21st-century Canadian artists
Artists from Saskatchewan
Canadian painters
University of Saskatchewan alumni
1950 births
2012 deaths